Poitiers (Poitevin: Poetàe) is a city on the River Clain in west-central France. It is a commune and the capital of the Vienne department and the historical centre of Poitou. In 2017 it had a population of 88,291. Its agglomeration has 130,853 inhabitants in 2016 and is the center of an urban area of 261,795 inhabitants.

With more than 29,000 students, Poitiers has been a major university city since the creation of its university in 1431, having hosted René Descartes, Joachim du Bellay and François Rabelais, among others. A city of art and history, still known as "Ville aux cent clochers" the centre of town is picturesque and its streets include predominantly historical architecture and half-timbered houses, especially religious architecture, mostly from the Romanesque period ; including notably the Saint-Jean baptistery (4th century), the hypogeum of the Dunes (7th century), the Notre-Dame-la-Grande church (12th century), the Saint-Porchaire church (12th century) or the Saint-Pierre cathedral (end of the 12th century) as well as the courthouse (12th century), former palace of the Counts of Poitou, Dukes of Aquitaine, where the Queen of France and England Eleanor of Aquitaine held her court.

The city's name is associated with two major battles that took place in the area. The first, in 732, also known as the Battle of Tours (to avoid confusion with the second), saw the Franks commanded by Charles Martel defeat an expeditionary army of the Umayyad Caliphate. The second, in 1356, was one of the key battles of the Hundred Years' War. It saw the defeat of a larger French royal army by the English and the capture of John II by the victorious Prince of Wales.

The Poitiers agglomeration, located halfway between Paris and Bordeaux, is home to the Futuroscope technopole, which includes major public (CNED, Canopé, etc.) and private companies of national scope, as well as leading European research laboratories. With 2 million visitors annually, Futuroscope is the leading tourist site in Nouvelle-Aquitaine and the third most popular amusement park in France after Disneyland Paris and the Puy du Fou.

Geography

Location
The city of Poitiers is strategically situated on the Seuil du Poitou, a shallow gap between the Armorican and the Central Massif. The Seuil du Poitou connects the Aquitaine Basin to the South to the Paris Basin to the North. This area is an important geographic crossroads in France and Western Europe.

Situation
Poitiers's primary site sits on a vast promontory between the valleys of the Boivre and the Clain. This was an especially important factor before and throughout the Middle Ages.

Inhabitants and demography
Inhabitants of Poitiers are referred to as Poitevins or Poitevines, although this denomination can be used for anyone from the Poitou province.

Climate
The climate in the Poitiers area is mild with mild temperature amplitudes, and adequate rainfall throughout the year although with a drying tendency during summer.  The Köppen Climate Classification subtype for this type of climate is "Cfb" (Marine West Coast Climate/Oceanic climate).

History

Antiquity
Poitiers was founded by the Celtic tribe of the Pictones and was known as the oppidum Lemonum before Roman influence. The name is said to have come from the Celtic word for elm, Lemo. After Roman influence took over, the town became known as Pictavium, or later "Pictavis", after the original Pictones inhabitants themselves.

There is a rich history of archeological finds from the Roman era in Poitiers. In fact until 1857 Poitiers hosted the ruins of a vast Roman amphitheatre, which was larger than that of Nîmes. Remains of Roman baths, built in the 1st century and demolished in the 3rd century, were uncovered in 1877.

In 1879 a burial-place and tombs of a number of Christian martyrs were discovered on the heights to the south-east of the town. The names of some of the Christians had been preserved in paintings and inscriptions.

The Romans also built at least three aqueducts. This extensive ensemble of Roman constructions suggests Poitiers was a town of first importance, possibly even the capital of the Roman province of Gallia Aquitania during the 2nd century.

As Christianity was made official and gradually introduced across the Roman Empire during the 3rd and 4th centuries, the first bishop of Poitiers from 350 to 367, Hilary of Poitiers or Saint Hilarius, proceeded to evangelize the town. Exiled by Constantius II, he risked death to return to Poitiers as Bishop. The first foundations of the Baptistère Saint-Jean can be traced to that era of open Christian evangelization. He was named "Doctor of The Church" by Pope Pius IX.

In the 4th century, a thick wall 6m wide and 10m high was built around the town. Around this time, the town began to be known as Poitiers.

Fifty years later Poitiers fell into the hands of the Arian Visigoths, and became one of the principal residences of their kings. Visigoth King Alaric II was defeated by Clovis I at Vouillé, not far from Poitiers, in 507, and the town thus came under Frankish dominion.

Middle Ages

During most of the Early Middle Ages, the town of Poitiers took advantage of its defensive tactical site and of its location, which was far from the centre of Frankish power. As the seat of an évêché (bishopric) since the 4th century, the town was a centre of some importance and the capital of the Poitou county. At the height of their power, the Counts of Poitiers governed a large domain, including both Nouvelle-Aquitaine and Poitou.

The town was often referred to as Poictiers, a name commemorated in warships of the Royal Navy, after the battle of Poitiers.

The first decisive victory of a Western European Christian army over a Muslim power, the Battle of Tours, was fought by Charles Martel's men in the vicinity of Poitiers on 10 October 732. For many historians, it was one of the world's pivotal moments.

Eleanor of Aquitaine frequently resided in the town, which she embellished and fortified, and in 1199 entrusted with communal rights. In 1152 she married the future King Henry II of England in Poitiers Cathedral.

During the Hundred Years' War, the Battle of Poitiers, an English victory, was fought near the town of Poitiers on 19 September 1356. Later in the war in 1418, under duress, the royal parliament moved from Paris to Poitiers, where it remained in exile until the Plantagenets finally withdrew from the capital in 1436. During this interval, in 1429 Poitiers was the site of Joan of Arc's formal inquest.

The University of Poitiers was founded in 1431. During and after the Reformation, John Calvin had numerous converts in Poitiers and the town had its share of the violent proceedings which underlined the Wars of Religion throughout France.

In 1569 Poitiers was defended by Gui de Daillon, comte du Lude, against Gaspard de Coligny, who after an unsuccessful bombardment and seven weeks, retired from a siege he had laid to the town.

16th century

The type of political organisation existing in Poitiers during the late medieval or early modern period can be glimpsed through a speech given on 14 July 1595 by Maurice Roatin, the town's mayor. He compared it to the Roman state, which combined three types of government: monarchy, aristocracy, and democracy. He said the Roman consulate corresponded to Poitiers' mayor, the Roman Senate to the town's peers and échevins, and the democratic element in Rome corresponded to the fact that most important matters "can not be decided except by the advice of the Mois et Cent" (broad council).1 The mayor appears to have been an advocate of a mixed constitution; not all Frenchmen in 1595 would have agreed with him, at least in public; many spoke in favour of absolute monarchy. The democratic element was not as strong as the mayor's words may seem to imply: in fact, Poitiers was similar to other French cities, Paris, Nantes, Marseille, Limoges, La Rochelle, Dijon, in that the town's governing body (corps de ville) was "highly exclusive and oligarchical": a small number of professional and family groups controlled most of the city offices. In Poitiers many of these positions were granted for the lifetime of the office holder.2

The city government in Poitiers based its claims to legitimacy on the theory of government where the mayor and échevins held jurisdiction of the city's affairs fief from the king: that is, they swore allegiance and promised support for him, and in return he granted them local authority. This gave them the advantage of being able to claim that any townsperson who challenged their authority was being disloyal to the king. Every year the mayor and the 24 échevins would swear an oath of allegiance "between the hands" of the king or his representative, usually the lieutenant général or the sénéchaussée. For example, in 1567, when Maixent Poitevin was mayor, king Henry III came for a visit, and, although some townspeople grumbled about the licentious behaviour of his entourage, Henry smoothed things over with a warm speech acknowledging their allegiance and thanking them for it.2

In this era, the mayor of Poitiers was preceded by sergeants wherever he went, consulted deliberative bodies, carried out their decisions, "heard civil and criminal suits in first instance", tried to ensure that the food supply would be adequate, visited markets.2

In the 16th century, Poitiers impressed visitors because of its large size, and important features, including "royal courts, university, prolific printing shops, wealthy religious institutions, cathedral, numerous parishes, markets, impressive domestic architecture, extensive fortifications, and castle."3

16th-century Poitiers is closely associated with the life of François Rabelais and with the community of Bitards.

17th century
The town saw less activity during the Renaissance. Few changes were made in the urban landscape, except for laying way for the rue de la Tranchée. Bridges were built where the inhabitants had used gués. A few hôtels particuliers were built at that time, such as the hôtels Jean Baucé, Fumé and Berthelot. Poets Joachim du Bellay and Pierre Ronsard met at the University of Poitiers, before leaving for Paris.

During the 17th century, many people emigrated from Poitiers and the Poitou to the French settlements in the new world and thus many Acadians or Cajuns living in North America today can trace ancestry back to this region.

18th century
During the 18th century, the town's activity mainly depended on its administrative functions as a regional centre: Poitiers served as the seat for the regional administration of royal justice, the évêché, the monasteries and the intendance of the Généralité du Poitou.

The Vicomte de Blossac, intendant of Poitou from 1750 to 1784, had a French garden landscaped in Poitiers. He also had Aliénor d'Aquitaine's ancient wall razed and modern boulevards were built in its place.

19th century
During the 19th century, many army bases were built in Poitiers because of its central and strategic location. Poitiers became a garrison town, despite its distance from France's borders.

The Poitiers train station was built in the 1850s, and connected Poitiers to the rest of France.

20th century and contemporary Poitiers
Poitiers was bombed during World War II, particularly the area around the railway station which was heavily hit on 13 June 1944.

From the late 1950s until the late 1960s when Charles de Gaulle ended the American military presence, the U.S. Army and U.S. Air Force had an array of military installations in France, including a major Army logistics and communications hub in Poitiers, part of what was called the Communication Zone (ComZ), and consisting of a logistics headquarters and communications agency located at Aboville Caserne, a military compound situated on a hill above the city. Hundreds of graduates ("Military Brats") of Poitiers American High School, a school operated by the Department of Defense School System (DODDS), have gone on to successful careers, including the recent commander-in-chief of U.S. Special Forces Command, Army General Bryan (Doug) Brown. The Caserne also housed a full support community, with a theater, commissary, recreation facilities and an affiliate radio station of the American Forces Network, Europe, headquartered in Frankfurt (now Mannheim, Germany).

The town benefited from industrial décentralisation in the 1970s, for instance with the installation during that decade of the Michelin and Compagnie des compteurs Schlumberger factories. The Futuroscope theme-park and research park project, built in 1986–1987 in nearby Chasseneuil-du-Poitou, after an idea by René Monory, consolidated Poitiers' place as a touristic destination and as a modern university centre, and opened the town to the era of information technology.

Landmarks and attractions

 Baptistère Saint-Jean (4th century), the oldest church in France
 Palace of Poitiers, the seat of the dukes of Aquitaine
 Église Notre-Dame-la-Grande, oldest romanesque architecture church in Europe
 Cathédrale Saint-Pierre, Poitiers's cathedral (12th century)
 Musée Sainte-Croix, the largest museum in Poitiers
 Church of St. Radegonde (6th century)
 Église Saint-Hilaire-le-Grand (11th century)
 Hypogée des Dunes (underground chapel)
 Jardin des Plantes de Poitiers, a park and botanical garden
 Église de Montierneuf
 Théâtre Municipal de Poitiers, by the French architect Édouard Lardillier
 Le Confort Moderne

Sports
The Stade Poitevin, founded in 1900, is a multi-sports club, which fields several top-level teams in a variety of sports. These include a volleyball team that play in the French Pro A volleyball league, a basketball team, an amateur football team and a professional rugby team (as of the 2008–2009 season.)

The PB86 or Poitiers Basket 86 (www.pb86.fr) play in the French Pro A basketball league. In the 2009–10 season, three Americans played for PB86: Rasheed Wright, Kenny Younger and Tommy Gunn. The team played the French championship playoffs in the 2009–10 season and was the Pro B French Champion for the 2008–2009 season. The team's communication strategy is considered by some to be one of the best in the French basketball league.

Brian Joubert, the figure skating champion, practices at Poitiers' ice rink and lives with his family in the city.

Tourism

Historic churches, in particular Romanesque church buildings, are the main attraction inside Poitiers itself. The town's centre is picturesque, with generally well-preserved architecture and a recently re-zoned pedestrian area. There are numerous shops, cafes and restaurants in the town centre.

Since 1987, Poitiers' tourist industry has indirectly benefited from the Futuroscope theme-park and research park in nearby Chasseneuil-du-Poitou. The centre of town receives visits in complement to the theme-park and benefits from a larger proportion of European tourists, notably from the United Kingdom. In conjunction, Poitiers' tourism has directly benefited from the TGV high-speed rail link to Paris.

Transport
Poitiers' railway station lies on the TGV Atlantique line between Paris and Bordeaux. The station is in the valley to the west of the old town centre. Services run to Angoulême, Limoges and La Rochelle in addition to Paris and Bordeaux. The direct TGV puts Poitiers 1h40 from Paris' Gare Montparnasse.

Urban transportation in Poitiers is provided by a company called Vitalis. Regional ground transportation in the department of the Vienne is provided by private bus companies such as "Ligne en Vienne". Rail transportation in the region is provided by the public TER Nouvelle-Aquitaine (regional express train).

From January 2009 to December 2012, Poitiers' town centre went through deep changes to make it less accessible to motor vehicles. The project, named "Projet Coeur d'Agglo", focused on re-thinking the way people use individual cars to access the town centre and as an everyday way of transportation. On 29 September 2010, 12 streets were permanently closed off to motor vehicles and transformed into an entirely pedestrian zone.

Eventually, a new line of fast buses will be added around 2017.

Education
The city of Poitiers has a very old tradition as a university centre, starting in the Middle Ages. The University of Poitiers was established in 1431 and has welcomed many famous philosophers and scientists throughout the ages (notably François Rabelais; René Descartes; Francis Bacon; Samir Amin).

Today Poitiers has more students per inhabitant than any other large town or city in France. All around, there are over 27,000 university students in Poitiers, nearly 4,000 of which are foreigners, hailing from 117 countries. The University covers all major fields from sciences to geography, history, languages economics and law.

The law degree at the University of Poitiers is considered to be one of the best in France. The program was ranked second by l'Étudiant magazine in 2005.

In addition to the University, Poitiers also hosts two engineering schools and two business schools:
 the École nationale supérieure de mécanique et d'aérotechnique (ENSMA)
 the École nationale supérieure d'ingénieurs de Poitiers (ENSIP)
 the France Business School (FBS)
 the Institut d'Administration des Entreprises de Poitiers (IAE).

Since 2001, the city of Poitiers has hosted the first cycle of "the South America, Spain and Portugal" program from the Paris Institute of Political Studies, also known as Sciences Po.

International relations

Poitiers is twinned with:

 Northampton, England, United Kingdom
 Marburg, Germany
 Lafayette, United States
 Coimbra, Portugal
 Yaroslavl, Russia
 Iași, Romania
 Moundou, Chad

Notable people
This is a list of people of interest who were born or resided in Poitiers:
 Oklou (born 1993), musician, singer, music producer, DJ, composer and actress
 Hilary of Poitiers (c300–367), elected bishop of Poitiers around the year 350, exiled and returned to die there
 Saint Radegonde or Radegund (c. 520 to 587), Thuringian princess and queen of France, founded an abbey in Poitiers and performed miracles there
 Charles Martel, French general who defeated the Muslim Umayyad army in the Battle of Tours in 732
 Eleanor of Aquitaine, queen consort of France (1137-1152) and England (1152-1204), was born, periodically lived, and died in Poitiers.
 François Rabelais, Renaissance writer and humanist
 Pope Clement V
 St. Venantius Fortunatus, 6th-century Latin poet and hymnodist and Bishop in the Roman Catholic Church
 Blessed Marie Louise Trichet
 William Longchamp, buried at the abbey of Le Pin, 1197
 René Descartes studied law at the University of Poitiers
 Saint Louis de Montfort
 Michel Aco, explorer, was born in Poitiers
 Ribar Baikoua, basketball player
 Camille Berthomier, singer in English rock band Savages
 Antoine Brizard, born in Poitiers in 1994, member of the France men's national volleyball team.
 Susann Cokal, novelist, lived in Poitiers in mid-1980s and based her first novel Mirabilis on the geography of the city
 Lionel Charbonnier, footballer (goalkeeper), World Cup winner for France. Played most notably for AJ Auxerre and Rangers. 
 Romain Édouard, chess player and grandmaster
 Éric Élisor, former professional footballer
 Maryse Éwanjé-Épée, athlete
 Monique Éwanjé-Épée, athlete
 Fernand Fau, born in Poitiers in 1858, illustrator and cartoonist 
 Michel Foucault, philosopher
 Marie-France Garaud, born in Poitiers in 1934, politician
 Hélène Grémillon, (born 1977), writer, winner of the 2011 Prix Emmanuel Roblès
 Camille Guérin, born in Poitiers in 1872, discovered a vaccine against tuberculosis with Albert Calmette in 1924
 Bruce Inkango, footballer
 Yassine Jebbour, footballer
 Brian Joubert, ice skating champion
 Natan Jurkovitz (born 1995), French-Swiss-Israeli basketball player for Hapoel Be'er Sheva of the Israeli Basketball Premier League
 Hervé Lhommedet, footballer
 Frédéric Mémin, footballer
 Blanche Monnier, Socialite. Known for being locked by her mother for 25 years
 Mahyar Monshipour, World Boxing Association super bantamweight champion from 2003 to 2006
 Francis N'Ganga, footballer
 Elsa N'Guessan, swimmer
 Simon Pagenaud, race car driver
 Jean-Pierre Raffarin,  politician and senator for Vienne, former prime minister of France (2002–2005)
 Joël Robuchon, born in Poitiers in 1945, French chef and restaurateur
 Paul Rougnon, composer and professor at the Conservatoire de Paris
 Jean-Pierre Thiollet, born in Poitiers in 1956, French author
 Louis Vierne, organist & composer, eventually at the Notre Dame cathedral, Paris
 Romain Vincelot, footballer

See also

 Communes of the Vienne department
 Pierre-Marie Poisson
 The works of Maxime Real del Sarte

References

Bibliography
 Archives communales de Poitiers, reg. 54, pp. 211–213; in Harry J. Bernstein, Between Crown and Community: Politics and Civic Culture in Sixteenth-Century Poitiers. 2004, Ithaca N.Y., USA: Cornell University Press, p. 22.
 Harry J. Bernstein, Between Crown and Community: Politics and Civic Culture in Sixteenth-Century Poitiers. 2004, Ithaca N.Y., USA: Cornell University Press, pp. 22–30.
 ibid., p. 2.

External links

 Official website of the City of Poitiers
 Grand-Poitiers website
 Prefecture of the Vienne
 Vitalis Official website (Urban Transportation)
 Les lignes régulières dans la Vienne (Vienne transportation)
 Official website TER Nouvelle-Aquitaine
 
 Site of the Tourist Office of Poitiers
 The University of Poitiers website
 Poitiers – History, Churches, Streets and Museum

 
Communes of Vienne
Prefectures in France
Gallia Aquitania
Poitou
Cities in Nouvelle-Aquitaine